Hospital Show is a Canadian comedy web series about the cast of the fictional hit primetime medical drama Critical Condition. The series was created, written, directed, produced and edited by Adam Greydon Reid. The short form series premiered in late 2019 on YouTube in ten 5-7 minute chapters, and Telus's Optik streaming platform in its feature length form.

Hospital Show received two Canadian Screen Award nominations at the 8th Canadian Screen Awards in 2020, for Best Lead Performance in a Program or Series Produced for Digital Media (Canning) and Best Supporting Performance in a Program or Series Produced for Digital Media (Reid). Hospital Show was the winner of the Best Web/TV series at the 2020 Florence Film Awards Competition.

In March 2022, it was announced that Saloon Media and Bullrush Pictures would co-develop and co-produce a full half-hour television series adaptation of Hospital Show.

Plot
Charlie Nielson is a medical school dropout come actress, who was on track to become a respected doctor, but plays one on television instead. Now she has had enough of working for the network and wants to become a real doctor.

Cast and characters
 Sara Canning as Charlie
 Adrian Holmes as Rich
 Adam Greydon Reid as Will
 Jordan Connor as Vince
 Enid-Raye Adams as Carol-Ann
 Valerie Tian as Astrid

Episodes

References

External links

Canadian comedy web series
2019 web series debuts
2010s YouTube series
2020s YouTube series